The AFL pre-season draft is the drafting of uncontracted players to teams in the Australian Football League. The draft is conducted after the national AFL draft and before the start of the next AFL season. It is conducted at the same time as the AFL rookie draft. The pre-season draft is a place for any uncontracted players to nominate that missed the AFL draft or who were delisted after the main draft.  It was first held in 1989 and has been diminishing greatly in its importance; the last five years have only averaged 8 selections per year, compared to over 50 in each of the first five years.  It was considered that the pre-season draft only existed to protect the league from writs for restraint-of-trade, but due to the introduction of free agency in 2012, there have been calls to scrap the pre-season draft and extend the free agency period.

Eligibility
Clubs receive selections in the draft based on where they finished on the AFL ladder during the year, for example, Melbourne finished last in the 2008 AFL season, therefore receiving the first pick in each of the three drafts (national, pre-season and rookie). Teams have the choice of whether to participate in the pre-season draft; many clubs fill their playing roster at the national draft, and hence do not participate in the pre-season draft. Also, unlike the national draft, picks in the pre-season drafts cannot be traded between clubs.

Players
Historically, the pre-season draft has involved mostly recycled players.  Until 2008, due to the standard players contract expiring at the end of November, players who did not wish to sign a new contract with their current club were forced to enter the pre-season draft if they were unable to be traded to another club during the trade week held prior to the national draft.  There was no free agency in the AFL to allow uncontracted players to easily move clubs until after the 2012 season.  Delisted players had the option of nominating for either the national or pre-season drafts.  In 2008 the rules were changed to also give uncontracted players the option of nominating for either draft.  However, the number of players being selected after being delisted or coming out of contract is diminishing, as most teams are not prepared to pick them ahead of younger players.
  
The lack of free agency was a powerful bargaining tool during trade week, as the team with the first pick can refuse a trade for a current uncontracted player at another club, and then recruit the player that wants to join their team for free with the first pick in the pre-season draft without giving anything to the other club. Conversely, the threat of losing a player for nothing into the pre-season draft can force a team to trade him for less than the player's true value.

Given that changes to each AFL club's playing list is strictly restricted to the three drafts and the trade week, the headline news following each pre-season draft is often who wasn't selected, as much as who was selected. In the 2005 draft this included that Shane Woewodin, the 2000 Brownlow Medal winner, was not selected, and hence would not play football at AFL level in 2006.  In 2008, the main story was about whether another Brownlow Medallist, Ben Cousins would be selected, which he subsequently was with Richmond's pick 6.

Number 1 picks
Number 1 picks in the Pre-season drafts are as follows.  As the pre-season was originally held towards the end of the pre-season in January or February, the naming of the draft is based on the following season.  This is different from the naming of the national draft (which occurs in November), which is named according to the season just completed.  Hence the 2008 national draft was held on 30 November 2008, whilst the 2008 pre-season draft was held on 11 December 2007.

1989 – Brian Winton
1990 – David Cloke
1991 – Michael McLean
1992 – Ashley Green
1993 – Richard Osborne
1994 – Dermott Brereton
1995 – Paul Roos
1996 – Brian McInnes
1997 – Stephen Paxman
1998 – Jamie Shanahan
1999 – David Calthorpe
2000 – Shane O'Bree
2001 – Brett Voss
2002 – Aaron Lord
2003 – Stephen Powell
2004 – Jade Rawlings
2005 – Trent Knobel
2006 – Dylan McLaren
2007 – Cain Ackland
2008 – David Gourdis
2009 – Liam Jurrah  
2010 – Joel Macdonald
2011 – Nathan Ablett
2012 – Aaron Hall
2013 – Jed Lamb

Notable pre-season draft picks
Ben Graham – #40 1992 Preseason Draft
Justin Peckett – #49 1992 Preseason Draft
Darryl Wakelin – #11 1993 Pre-Season Draft
Craig McRae – #22 1993 Pre-Season Draft
Paul Roos – #1 1995 pre-season draft
Peter Vardy – #7 1995 Pre-Season Draft
Tyson Edwards – #21 1995 Pre-Season Draft
Peter Bell – #15 1996 Pre-Season Draft
Stephen Paxman – #1 1997 pre-season draft
Simon Goodwin – #18 1996 Pre-Season Draft
Shane Woewodin – #18 1997 Pre-Season Draft
Joel Smith	- #2 1998 Pre-Season Draft
Jared Poulton – #5 1999 pre-season draft
Shane O'Bree – #1 2000 pre-season draft
Brett Voss	- #1 2001 Pre Season Draft
Craig Bolton – #3 2003 pre-season draft
Nick Stevens – #2 2004 pre-season draft
Jacob Surjan – #10 2004 pre-season draft
Josh Mahoney – #12 2004 pre-season draft
Eddie Betts – #3 2005 pre-season draft
Scott Camporeale – #4 2006 pre-season draft
Mal Michael – #2 2007 pre-season draft
Cameron Cloke – #9 2007 pre-season draft
Stefan Martin – #3 2008 pre-season draft
Scott Welsh – #4 2008 pre-season draft
Tom Rockliff – #5 2009 pre-season draft
Ben Cousins – #6 2009 pre-season draft
Nathan Ablett – #1 2011 pre-season draft
Bachar Houli – #3 2011 pre-season draft
Cameron Bruce – #5 2011 pre-season draft
Jack Anthony – #6 2011 pre-season draft

See also
Australian Football League draft

External links
AFL official draft website

References

Australian Football League draft